Sea Dogs of Australia is a 1913 Australian silent film about an Australian naval officer blackmailed into helping a foreign spy. The film was publicly released in August 1914, but was almost immediately withdrawn after the Minister for Defence expressed security concerns about footage of the battlecruiser .

Plot
Lieutenant Verner (Eric Howell) incurs massive gambling debts, and a foreign spy, Herman Markoff, tries to blackmail him into stealing some secret plans for an explosive. Verner agrees and helps Markoff kidnap his friend, Lieutenant Sidney, but is stopped by Dave Smith, a champion Australian boxer. Verner tries again and by torturing Sidney succeeds in securing the plans. Verner decides to use the plans to blow up the battlecruiser , but Sidney manages to escape and kill Markoff. Verner almost escapes on a ship, but Australia sinks it and Verner dies.

The chapter headings were:
sailor ant his ladd
the shadow of the 12-inch guns
the new explosive
the spy
the stolen plan from the chart room of HMAS Australia
attempted robbery
a well known Australian pugilist to the rescue
kidnapped
black treachery
the strange cruiser
the submarine mine
the fastest craft in Australian waters
the chase
HMAS Australia in action – the 12 inch guns in play
the destruction of the mysterious warship by the 12 inch guns of HMAS Australia
the secret safe
Australia's own.

Cast
Eric Howell as Lieutenant Verner
Dave Smith as himself
Charles Villers

Production
During late 1913, filming occurred aboard Australia.

Release
The film was trade screened in December 1913 but not released commercially until August the following year. It was then withdrawn from screening by order of the Minister for Defence, most likely due to security concerns over footage of Australia.

References

External links
 
Sea Dogs of Australia at the National Film and Sound Archive

Australian black-and-white films
1913 films
1913 drama films
Australian drama films
Australian silent short films
1913 short films
Silent drama films